Dennis McCord may refer to:

 Dennis McCord, wrestler who used the stage name Austin Idol
 Dennis McCord (ice hockey) (1952–2005), ice hockey player